Events in the year 1976 in Japan. It corresponds to Shōwa 51 (昭和51年) in the Japanese calendar.

Incumbents 
Emperor: Hirohito
Prime minister: Takeo Miki (Liberal Democratic) until December 24, Takeo Fukuda (Liberal Democratic)
Chief Cabinet Secretary: Ichitaro Ide until December 24, Sunao Sonoda
Chief Justice of the Supreme Court: Tomokazu Murakami until May 24, Ekizo Fujibayashi from May 25
President of the House of Representatives: Shigesaburō Maeo until December 9, Shigeru Hori from December 24
President of the House of Councillors: Kenzō Kōno
Diet sessions: 77th (regular session opened on December 27, 1975, to May 24), 78th (extraordinary, September 16 to November 4), 79th (extraordinary, December 24 to December 28), 80th (regular, December 30 to June 9, 1977)

Governors
Aichi Prefecture: Yoshiaki Nakaya 
Akita Prefecture: Yūjirō Obata 
Aomori Prefecture: Shunkichi Takeuchi 
Chiba Prefecture: Kiichi Kawakami 
Ehime Prefecture: Haruki Shiraishi 
Fukui Prefecture: Heidayū Nakagawa 
Fukuoka Prefecture: Hikaru Kamei 
Fukushima Prefecture: Morie Kimura (until 11 August); Isao Matsudaira (starting 16 September)
Gifu Prefecture: Saburō Hirano (until 14 December); vacant thereafter (starting 14 December)
Gunma Prefecture: Konroku Kanda (until 1 August); Ichiro Shimizu (starting 2 August)
Hiroshima Prefecture: Hiroshi Miyazawa 
Hokkaido: Naohiro Dōgakinai 
Hyogo Prefecture: Tokitada Sakai
Ibaraki Prefecture: Fujio Takeuchi 
Ishikawa Prefecture: Yōichi Nakanishi 
Iwate Prefecture: Tadashi Chida 
Kagawa Prefecture: Tadao Maekawa 
Kagoshima Prefecture: Saburō Kanemaru 
Kanagawa Prefecture: Kazuji Nagasu 
Kochi Prefecture: Chikara Nakauchi  
Kumamoto Prefecture: Issei Sawada 
Kyoto Prefecture: Torazō Ninagawa 
Mie Prefecture: Ryōzō Tagawa 
Miyagi Prefecture: Sōichirō Yamamoto 
Miyazaki Prefecture: Hiroshi Kuroki 
Nagano Prefecture: Gon'ichirō Nishizawa 
Nagasaki Prefecture: Kan'ichi Kubo 
Nara Prefecture: Ryozo Okuda 
Niigata Prefecture: Takeo Kimi 
Oita Prefecture: Masaru Taki 
Okayama Prefecture: Shiro Nagano 
Okinawa Prefecture: Chōbyō Yara (until 24 June); Koichi Taira (starting 25 June)
Osaka Prefecture: Ryōichi Kuroda 
Saga Prefecture: Sunao Ikeda 
Saitama Prefecture: Yawara Hata 
Shiga Prefecture: Masayoshi Takemura 
Shiname Prefecture: Seiji Tsunematsu 
Shizuoka Prefecture: Keizaburō Yamamoto 
Tochigi Prefecture: Yuzuru Funada 
Tokushima Prefecture: Yasunobu Takeichi 
Tokyo: Ryōkichi Minobe 
Tottori Prefecture: Kōzō Hirabayashi 
Toyama Prefecture: Kokichi Nakada 
Wakayama Prefecture: Shirō Kariya  
Yamagata Prefecture: Seiichirō Itagaki 
Yamaguchi Prefecture: Masayuki Hashimoto (until 30 June); Toru Hirai (starting 22 August)
Yamanashi Prefecture: Kunio Tanabe

Events 
 
March 2 – A time bomb goes off in the lobby of the Hokkaido Government Main Building in Sapporo, killing 2 and injuring 95.
May 15 – According to Japan National Police Agency official confirmed report, a riot by motorbike gang group (Bōsōzoku) attack to police officer in Chuō-ku, Kobe, the resulting to official, killed one journalist, twenty person policemen were injures.  
June 26 – Muhammad Ali vs. Antonio Inoki was a controversial spectacle fight, held in Tokyo, between the boxing heavyweight champion, Ali, and Japanese professional wrestling champion, Inoki. 
September 6 – Soviet Air Force  pilot Lt. Viktor Belenko lands a MiG-25 jet fighter at Hakodate, Hokkaido, requests political asylum in the United States.
September 12 – Typhoon Fran, according to Fire and Management Disaster Agency of Japan confirmed report, 171 person were lost to lives, 537 were injures.
October 29 – A massive fire in Sakata, Yamagata Prefecture, according to Fire and Management Disaster Agency confirmed report, a person lives, 1,003 person injures, 1,774 house and building with 22.5 hectare (55.26 acre) were lost.      
December 5 – General election of 1976 - The Liberal Democratic Party win 249 out of 511 seats but lose 22 seats, majority control over the House of Representatives owing to the Lockheed scandal.
December 24 – Prime Minister Takeo Miki resigns following poor results in the 1976 General election and is succeeded by Takeo Fukuda.
Full date unknown:
 Helios Techno Holding Co., Ltd. is established.

Births 

January 4 – Shiro Amano, manga artist/writer
January 5 – Shintarō Asanuma, voice actor
January 12 – Miki Nakatani, actress
January 28 – Emiko Kado, professional wrestler (d. 1999)
February 14 – Juju, jazz singer
February 16 – Kyo, rock musician
February 27 – Yukari Tamura, voice actress and songwriter
March 22 – Asako Toki,  singer and songwriter
March 29 – Daisuke Namikawa, voice actor
March 30 – Ayako Kawasumi, voice actress
April 10
Yoshino Kimura, actress
Norihiro Akahoshi, former professional baseball player  
April 17 – Taishi Mori, manga artist
May 4 – Anza, singer and actress
June 1 – Kōhei Murakami, actor
June 11 – Gran Naniwa, professional wrestler
June 29 – Haruka Igawa, actress
July 4 – Daijiro Kato, motorcycle racer
August 29 – Mieko Kawakami, singer and writer
September 20 – Yui Horie, voice actress
October 19 – Ryuji Imada, golfer
November 19 – Jun Shibata, singer and songwriter
December 18 – Koyuki, actress

Deaths 
January 2  – Kazuo Dan, novelist and poet (b. 1912)
January 19  – Hidetsugu Yagi, electrical engineer (b. 1886)
January 27  – Kaneko Daiei, Buddhist philosopher (b. 1881)
May 30  – Mitsuo Fuchida, aviator, naval officer and Christian evangelist (b. 1902)
June 7  – Shigetarō Shimada, Imperial Japanese Navy admiral during World War II (b. 1883)

See also
 1976 in Japanese television
 List of Japanese films of 1976

References

 
Japan
Years of the 20th century in Japan